23S rRNA (cytosine1962-C5)-methyltransferase (RlmI, rRNA large subunit methyltransferase I, YccW) is an enzyme with systematic name S-adenosyl-L-methionine:23S rRNA (cytosine1962-C5)-methyltransferase. This enzyme catalyses the following chemical reaction

 S-adenosyl-L-methionine + cytosine1962 in 23S rRNA  S-adenosyl-L-homocysteine + 5-methylcytosine1962 in 23S rRNA

The enzyme specifically methylates cytosine1962 at C5 in 23S rRNA.

References

External links 

EC 2.1.1